Witch is the eponymous debut album of Witch, a stoner doom band founded by J Mascis of Dinosaur Jr. "Soul of Fire" was released as a single with a demo version of "Rip Van Winkle" as the b-side.

Track listing 
 "Seer" - 7:57
 "Soul of Fire" - 3:37
 "Black Saint" - 6:02
 "Changing" - 6:42
 "Rip Van Winkle" - 4:43
 "Hand of Glory" - 5:28
 "Isadora" - 6:00

References

External links
"Seer" music video hosted on YouTube

2006 debut albums
Witch (band) albums
Tee Pee Records albums
Albums produced by John Agnello